Darlie (originally known as Darkie) is an oral care brand owned and manufactured by the Hawley & Hazel Company with focus on Chinese and Southeast Asian markets.  The company is headquartered in Hong Kong with manufacturing facilities in Zhongshan. The name, logo, and brand-mascot of the company have been the subject of ongoing controversy regarding racial stereotyping.

History

The brand was launched as Darkie in Shanghai in the 1930s. Colgate-Palmolive acquired 50% equity in Hawley & Hazel in 1985. After the entry of Colgate-Palmolive, the brand continued to be sold in several Asian countries, including Taiwan, China, Indonesia, Malaysia, Singapore, Vietnam and Thailand. Colgate-Palmolive announced the brand would not be sold outside of Asia. Darkie experienced an increase in popularity and notoriety in 2004 after the toothpaste, along with other racially-charged name brands, were featured in mock-advertisements contained in the mockumentary C.S.A.: The Confederate States of America. It was depicted as a fictional brand that is popular in the alternative history of the film; the final credits reveal that it, along with most of the other brands advertised, were at one time genuine products.

Naming
Hawley & Hazel marketed Darkie toothpaste using a parody of American minstrel performer Al Jolson (who had become popular for his blackface performances), as its logo and brand identification. "Darky," (or "darkie"), is a term that can be used as an ethnic slur for black people. The packaging featured an image of a wide-eyed white man in blackface, wearing a top hat, monocle, and bow-tie, an image closely associated with minstrel shows.

In 1985, when Colgate-Palmolive acquired 50% of Hawley & Hazel, controversy erupted over the brand in the United States, to which Colgate-Palmolive CEO Ruben Mark responded by issuing an apology.  He changed the English name of the toothpaste to "Darlie" in 1989, and altered the image on the packaging to show a racially ambiguous face in a top hat. The Chinese name of the brand, "黑人牙膏" (English: "Black Person Toothpaste"), however, remained the same and a Chinese-language advertising campaign reassured customers that "Black Person Toothpaste is still Black Person Toothpaste".

On June 19, 2020, following the murder of George Floyd and subsequent protests, Colgate-Palmolive announced it would work with Hawley & Hazel "...to review and further evolve all aspects" of the Darlie brand, including the brand name. At the time of the announcement, the Chinese name of Darlie was unchanged (still "黑人牙膏"). The announcement followed similar announcements made by PepsiCo–Quaker Oats (Aunt Jemima) and Mars, Incorporated (Uncle Ben's) for their respective brands. In November 2020, the blackface imagery of the brand remained unchanged.

On December 14, 2021, Hawley & Hazel announced the Chinese name of the brand will be changed from "黑人牙膏" ("Black Person Toothpaste") to "好來" ("Haolai") starting in March 2022, aligning it with the subsidiary company's name.

Product and market share 
The original flavor of Darlie was mint. Other flavors are available for children.

, the toothpaste held a 75% market share in Taiwan, 50% in Singapore, 30% in Malaysia and Hong Kong and 20% in Thailand. As of late 2018, Darlie is one of the bestselling toothpaste brands in its target market areas, with market shares ranging from 10 to 30 percent.

See also
 Chocolate-coated marshmallow treats, which in many languages are named with words akin to "darky"
 Commercial products using the word "nigger"
 List of toothpaste brands
 Index of oral health and dental articles

Notes

References

External links
 
 "Darkie Toothpaste" Blackens Colgate's Reputation

Products introduced in 1933
Brands of toothpaste
Colgate-Palmolive brands
Taiwanese brands
Hong Kong brands
Race-related controversies in advertising and marketing